Drago Horvat (born July 9, 1958) is a Slovenian ice hockey player who competed for Yugoslavia. He was born in Jesenice, Slovenia. He played for the Yugoslavia men's national ice hockey team at the 1984 Winter Olympics in Sarajevo.

References

1958 births
Living people
Ice hockey players at the 1984 Winter Olympics
Olympic ice hockey players of Yugoslavia
Sportspeople from Jesenice, Jesenice
Slovenian ice hockey forwards
HK Acroni Jesenice players
Yugoslav ice hockey forwards